Branicki Palace is a historical edifice in Białystok, Poland.
It was developed on the site of an earlier building in the first half of the 18th century by Jan Klemens Branicki, a wealthy Polish–Lithuanian Commonwealth hetman, into a residence suitable for a man whose ambition was to become king of Poland. The palace complex with gardens, pavilions, sculptures, outbuildings and other structures and the city with churches, city hall and monastery, all built almost at the same time according to French models was the reason why the city was known in the 18th century as Versailles de la Pologne (Versailles of Poland) and subsequently Versailles de la Podlachie (Versailles of Podlasie).

History
The Palace was built for Count Jan Klemens Branicki, Great Crown Hetman and patron of art and science, raised in the French milieu of the Polish aristocracy, who transformed a previous house into the suitably magnificent residence of a great Polish noble, a rival to Wilanów Palace, making a start in 1726. He also laid out the central part of the town of Bialystok, not a large place in the 18th century, with its triangular market.

The original wooden manor of the Raczkowicz family that occupied the site was transformed in the 16th century into a brick two-storey castle for Piotr Wiesiołowski the Younger. The architect was Hiob Bretfus, who constructed the a gothic-renaissance structure with a moat and earth ramparts. Shortly after the property was inherited by Stefan Mikołaj Branicki he commissioned the transformation of the castle into a baroque mansion. The structure was thoroughly reconstructed during 1691–1697 by Tylman Gamerski, including one of the towers adapted to a staircase. During the subsequent reconstruction, the side outbuildings were enhanced, the Ionic colonnade above the main entrance was erected and the whole structure was adorned with sculptures. Further expansion of the palace was conducted by Jan Klemens Branicki and his wife Izabella Poniatowska. Starting in 1728 the reconstruction of the palace was directed by Johann Sigmund Deybel. Under his supervision, the structure was enhanced, the tympanum and domes on the towers were added. Deybel is also the author of the main façade. The existing pavilions and outbuildings were merged with the main building (corps de logis) according to French model to form wings surrounding a horseshoe court - the courtyard of honour (cour d'honneur), which was closed with a gate built in 1758 by Jan Henryk Klemm. Among notable architects employed in reconstruction was Pierre Ricaud de Tirregaille. After the death of Deybel, in the years 1750–1771, the rebuilding of the palace was supervised by Jakub Fontana, who was an author of the palace's vestibule, rococo interiors and the staircase with statues by Jan Chrysostom Redler (1754). The fence between the initial (avant cour) and honor courtyard was adorned in 1757 with two monumental sculptures by Redler - Hercules fighting the dragon and Hercules fighting the hydra. Interior decorations were conducted by artists such as Szymon Czechowicz, Ludwik Marteau, Augustyn Mirys, Jean-Baptiste Pillement, fresco painters such as Georg Wilhelm Neunhertz (in 1738) and Antoni Herliczka and stucco decorators Samuel Contesse and Antoni Vogt.
   
The newly created Versailles de la Pologne concentrated many great artists, poets including Elżbieta Drużbacka and Franciszek Karpiński and scientists. A theater, orchestra and ballet were established. Among notable guests were King Augustus II the Strong (1726 to 1727 and again in 1729), King Augustus III and his wife and sons Prince Francis Xavier and Prince Charles (1744 and 1752), Prince Charles of Saxony, Duke of Courland (twice in 1759), Bishop Ignacy Krasicki (1760), King Stanisław August Poniatowski (occasionally), Emperor Joseph II Habsburg (1780), Grand Duke Paul, future Tsar Paul I of Russia, with his wife (1782), King Louis XVIII of France (1798), French, English, Turkish and Russian envoys and Italian actress.

With the third Partition of Poland it went to the Prussian Kingdom and, after 1807, to Russia. In the summer of 1920, briefly, the palace was the headquarters of the Provisional Polish Revolutionary Committee. Branicki Palace suffered from bombing and fires caused by the Germans, with damage totaling approximately 70%. It was restored after World War II as a matter of national pride. The Medical University of Białystok is housed in the Palace.

The palace grounds 
A straight avenue centred on the palace passes across the river on a three-arched bridge across the river, which is confined with deep stone embankment walling, to the large enclosed paved forecourt. The central block has two storeys upon a high arcaded basement storey, with a pedimented central block displaying Branicki's coat-of-arms and end pavilions that have squared domes in two tiers. The roofline is an Italianate balustrade that masks a low attic storey, and the heroic sculptural group of Atlas crowning all.

Surrounding the Palace are the grounds. The garden front has a terrace raised on columns, which forms a podium for viewing the parterre in the French taste with a main central allée and French sphinxes, and a later English landscape garden, in the naturalistic taste associated with the English park, surrounding the grounds. The central axis continues to a guest pavilion. Other outbuildings include the Arsenal (1755), Orangery and Italian and Tuscan Pavilions.

Gallery

See also
 List of Baroque residences
 Branicki Palace, Warsaw

References

External links

 VIRTUAL TOUR
 View of the palace from the drone

Baroque gardens
Baroque palaces in Poland
Branicki (Gryf)
Buildings and structures demolished in 1944
Buildings and structures in Białystok
Buildings and structures in Poland destroyed during World War II
Buildings and structures in the Polish–Lithuanian Commonwealth
Castles in Podlaskie Voivodeship
Demolished buildings and structures in Poland
Former castles in Poland
Former seats of local government
Gardens in Poland
Houses completed in 1697
Houses completed in 1960
Rebuilt buildings and structures in Poland
Rococo architecture in Poland
School buildings completed in 1960
Tourist attractions in Podlaskie Voivodeship
Tylman van Gameren buildings